Oliwier Wojciechowski (born 5 April 2005) is a Polish professional footballer who plays as a midfielder for Jagiellonia Białystok.

Career statistics

Club

Notes

References

External links

2005 births
Living people
Association football midfielders
Polish footballers
Poland youth international footballers
Jagiellonia Białystok players
III liga players
Ekstraklasa players